The following is a list of episodes for the anime series , which began airing in Japan on April 2, 2008. The series is currently licensed for release in North America by Konami. However, only 31 episodes from seasons 4 and 5 were dubbed into English by 4Kids Entertainment, due to low ratings, pressure to air Yu-Gi-Oh! Zexal, and an ongoing lawsuit from TV Tokyo and NAS.

Series overview

Theme songs

Opening themes

Ending themes

Insert Songs

Episode list

Season 1: Fortune Cup Duels (2008)

Season 2: Earthbound Immortals (2008–09)

Season 3: Road to Destiny (2009–10)

Season 4: World Racing Grand Prix (2010)

Season 5: Fight for the Future (2010–11)

Specials

Movies

See also
 Yu-Gi-Oh! Duel Monsters
 Yu-Gi-Oh! R
 Yu-Gi-Oh! GX
 Yu-Gi-Oh! Zexal
 Yu-Gi-Oh! Arc-V
 Yu-Gi-Oh! VRAINS
 Yu-Gi-Oh! Sevens

References

External links
 NASinc. (Japanese)
 TV Tokyo (Japanese)
 Janime
 

5D's *
Yu-Gi-Oh! 5D's